The Widow and Her Hero is a novel by the Australian author Thomas Keneally set in Australia during World War II.

Notes
 Dedication: "To the Coverdales - Alex, Rory, Craig, Margaret. With the Author's love."

Awards and nominations
 Miles Franklin Literary Award, 2008: longlisted 
 New South Wales Premier's Literary Awards, Christina Stead Prize for Fiction, 2008: shortlisted 
 Prime Minister's Literary Awards, Fiction, 2008: shortlisted

Interviews
 "ABC Radio National The Book Show"

Reviews
 The Age 
 The Australian 
 The Courier-Mail 
 The Guardian 
 Sydney Morning Herald 
 The Telegraph

References

Novels by Thomas Keneally
Novels set during World War II
2007 Australian novels
Doubleday (publisher) books
Australia in World War II